Bajour may refer to:

 Bajour District, a subdivision of Pakistan
 Bajour (musical), a Broadway musical
 Szymsia Bajour, a Jewish Polish-Argentine violinist